Cane Bay High School is a secondary school located in Summerville, South Carolina, United States. It is the newest addition to the Berkeley County School District.

History
The school opened in August 2008 to 9th and 10th graders, adding a grade each year. On August 17, 2010, the school opened its doors to all four grade levels for the first time.

References

External links

Public high schools in South Carolina
Schools in Berkeley County, South Carolina